Theater of Mineral NADEs is an album by the violinist/multi-instrumentalist Eyvind Kang, released in 1998 on John Zorn's Tzadik Records as part of the Composer Series.

Reception

CMJ New Music Monthly reviewer Randall Roberts stated: "On Theater Kang createsboth minimal glimpses and lush portraits, blending seemingly disparate musics; mandolins and tablas intertwine, harmoniums, violins, synthesizers and cellos flutter simultaneously. Experienced as a whole, Theater of Mineral NADEs runs like one long quasi-cinematic experience, as though a narrative is running through the music and telling its own story."
AllMusic music critic Stacia Proefrock wrote: "Theater of Mineral NADEs does not reach as far as some of Kang's previous work, but he also manages to succeed at nearly everything he tries on this album. It is a well executed, thoughtful piece."

Track listing 
All compositions by Eyvind Kang
 "The Earth & The Moon" - 2:02 		
 "Jewel of the Nade" - 1:20
 "Theory of the Supreme Ones" - 0:38
 "The Anointment" - 1:30 		
 "Mineralia" - 2:58
 "Pleasures of the Nade" - 1:20 		
 "Consensit Spiritus" - 3:16 		
 "(If I Sing a Song) So Good It" - 1:50
 "New Moon" - 2:00 		
 "Suleiman" - 2:38 		
 "Berdache" - 2:19 		
 "Moon" - 1:14 		
 "Mercury" - 0:47 		
 "The Curse" - 1:04 		
 "Lanvaettir" - 0:35 		
 "Fate Is Sealed" - 0:47 		
 "Private Mistery" - 0:38 		
 "Lost Souls" - 1:27 		
 "Ghost Dance" - 2:06 		
 "Lost Love" - 1:09 		
 "Lover Not a Hater" - 3:51 		
 "Mystic Nade" - 3:05 		
 "Mary of Magdalen" - 5:09 		
 "Jewel of the Nade" - 0:46

Personnel 
Eyvind Kang - violin, guitar, bass, keyboards, mandolin, tuba, recorder, percussion, voice
Susanna Knapp, Jessica Lurie - flute
Mike Anderson - trumpet
Steve Moore - trombone
James Philp - cornemuse, crumhorn, recorders, bass flute
Emmanuelle Somer - oboe
Terry Hsu, Alan Kestle - violin
Brent Arnold - cello
Trey Spruance - twelve-string guitar
Timothy Young - guitar
Christian Asplund - harmonium
Tari Nelson-Zagar, Dave Pascal, Ian Rashkin - bass
Tucker Martine, Mike Stone - drums
Mint - finger cymbals
Vishal Nagar - tabla
Ed Pias - percussion
Courtney Agguire - voice

References 

1998 albums
Tzadik Records albums
Eyvind Kang albums